is a Japanese bobsledder. He competed at the 1994 Winter Olympics and the 1998 Winter Olympics.

References

1969 births
Living people
Japanese male bobsledders
Olympic bobsledders of Japan
Bobsledders at the 1994 Winter Olympics
Bobsledders at the 1998 Winter Olympics
Sportspeople from Miyagi Prefecture